Enock Mukiibi (born 6 June 1991) commonly known as DJ Mavious (Omwana w’eka) is a Ugandan born-USA based  songwriter, musician and DJ.

Career
At the age of 14, he ventured into the music industry as a DJ at several house parties and functions in the USA at the start of his music career.  In 2018 he started songwriting and singing where he is popularly known for his songs such as Bantuma, Kakuba, Boss among others.

Discography

 Boss 2019
 Tinder 2019
 Kaloosa 2019
 Slow wine  2020
 Bantuma 2020
Kakuba 2021
Everyday 2021

Personal life
DJ Mavious was born in Kampala, he studied from Hilltop Academy, Shimoni Demonstration School but later he was taken to USA at the age of 14

References

External links
Meet Mavious, US-Based Ugandan DJ Flying Uganda’s Flag High
Ugandan born DJ Mavious shining on the International stage
Omwana Weka Dj Mavious’ ‘Bantuma’: Everything We Know About New Song .
Omwana Weka Dj Mavious Finally Releases ‘Bantuma’ Video. Watch It Here!

1991 births
Living people
21st-century Ugandan male singers
People from Kampala